The twenty-fifth season of the Case Closed anime was directed by Yasuichiro Yamamoto and produced by TMS Entertainment and Yomiuri Telecasting Corporation. The series is based on Gosho Aoyama's Case Closed manga series. In Japan, the series is titled  but was changed due to legal issues with the title Detective Conan. The series focuses on the adventures of teenage detective Shinichi Kudo who was turned into a child by a poison called APTX 4869, but continues working as a detective under the alias Conan Edogawa.

The episodes use seven pieces of theme music: four openings and three endings. 

The first opening theme is "WE GO" by BREAKERZ, which was used until episode 789.

(This is Koshi's second solo contribution to the series, after "Overture" was used as an ending theme in 2002.)

(This is also used for film 20: The Darkest Nightmare.)

The season began airing on May 3, 2015 through May 14, 2016 on Nippon Television Network System in Japan. The season was later collected and released in ten DVD compilations by Shogakukan between January 27, 2017 and November 24, 2017, in Japan. Crunchyroll began simulcasting the series in October 2014, starting with episode 754.



Episode list

Notes

References

Season25
2015 Japanese television seasons
2016 Japanese television seasons